The Shire of Diamantina is a local government area in Central West Queensland, bordering South Australia and the Northern Territory. Its administrative centre is in the town of Bedourie.

Like most places in Queensland with the "Diamantina" name, it was named after Lady Diamantina Bowen (née Roma), the wife of the first governor of Queensland, Sir George Bowen.

The shire was established in 1879. The town of Birdsville is home to the Birdsville Races, a horse race meeting to raise money for the Royal Flying Doctor Service.

History
Wangkangurru (also known as Arabana/Wangkangurru, Wangganguru, Wanggangurru, Wongkangurru) is an Australian Aboriginal language spoken on Wangkangurru country. It is closely related to Arabana language of South Australia. The Wangkangurru language region was traditionally in the South Australian-Queensland border region taking in Birdsville and extending south towards Innamincka and Lake Eyre, including the local government areas of the Shire of Diamantina as well as the Outback Communities Authority of South Australia.

Yawarrawarrka (also known as Yawarawarka, Yawarawarga, Yawarawarka, Jauraworka, Jawarawarka) is an Australian Aboriginal language of Far Western Queensland. The traditional language region includes the local government area of the Shire of Diamantina extending into the Outback Communities Authority of South Australia towards Innamincka.

Karuwali (also known as Garuwali, Dieri) is a language of far western Queensland. The Karuwali language region includes the landscape within the local government boundaries of the Diamantina Shire Council, including the localities of Betoota and Haddon Corner.
On 11 November 1879, the Diamantina Division was established as one of 74 divisions around Queensland under the Divisional Boards Act 1879 with a population of 1153.

In October 1880, part of Diamantina Division was separated to create Gregory Division.

On 21 June 1883, the boundaries between Diamantina Division and Bulloo Division were adjusted.

With the passage of the Local Authorities Act 1902, Diamantina Division became the Shire of Diamantina on 31 March 1903.

The seat of the Council moved from Birdsville to Bedourie in 1953.

In the 2021 census, Diamantina Shire had 266 people, down from 292 in 2018.

Towns and localities 
The Shire of Diamantina includes the following:
 Settlements
 Bedourie
 Betoota (ghost town)
 Birdsville
 National parks
 Astrebla National Park
 Diamantina National Park
 Simpson Desert National Park
 Archaeological sites
 Bilpa Morea, associated with the Burke and Wills expedition

Amenities 
Diamantina Shire Council operates public libraries in Bedourie and Birdsville.

Chairmen and mayors
Chairmen
 1889: William Blair (owner of the Birdsville Hotel)
 1927: Harry Afford 
 Mayors
 2008–2012: Robbie Dare (elected unopposed)
 2012–2020: Geoffrey (Geoff) Moreton 
2020–present: Robert Martin Dare

Population

References

External links
 Diamantina Shire Council
 Birdsville Library
 University of Queensland: Queensland Places: Diamantina Shire

 
Local government areas of Queensland
1879 establishments in Australia